James Turpin may refer to:

 James Turpin (organist) (1840–1896), English organist, composer and teacher
 James Turpin (cricketer) (born 1997), English cricketer
 James Wesley Turpin (born 1927), founder and director of Project Concern International
 James H. Turpin (1846–1893), American soldier and Medal of Honor recipient
 J. Clifford Turpin (1886–1966), pioneer aviator with the Wright Exhibition Team